Guillaume Durand is a French journalist, born 23 September 1952, in Boulogne-Billancourt (Hauts-de-Seine).

Son of French artists Lucien and Nicole Durand and formerly a professor of history and geography, he was weekend newsreader and evening the weekday prime time newsreader on La Cinq (1987–1990 and 1990–1991). Host of Nulle Part Ailleurs on Canal +, he went to France 2 Esprits Libres (2006–2008), L'objet du scandale (2009).

He hosts a talk show on Europe 1 as well as La Matinale on Radio Classique.

He married his second wife, Diane de MacMahon (descendant of Patrice de MacMahon, 3rd President of the French Republic), he is the father of four children.

Journalism
  Europe 1
  La Cinq
  Canal +
  France 2

References

1952 births
Living people
People from Boulogne-Billancourt
Lycée Janson-de-Sailly alumni
French television presenters
French male non-fiction writers
20th-century French journalists
21st-century French journalists
Prix Renaudot de l'essai winners